Bang Na station is a BTS Skytrain station, on the Sukhumvit Line in Bang Na District, Bangkok, Thailand.

Opened in 2011, it is a part of the Skytrain extension from On Nut to Bearing station. It has a skywalk to the Bangkok International Trade and Exhibition Centre (BITEC).

See also
 Bangkok Skytrain

References 

BTS Skytrain stations